Deus Vitae, or  is a manga series created by Takuya Fujima.

Plot
In 2068, Leave, a powerful android, is created by the Brain Computer and raised by the human scientist Fenrir to be the new root of mankind; the "Goddess", deciding that the previous human beings are no longer useful, wipes them out and creates four "mothers", each one in charge of a different quarter of the world, and a new race of androids, the Selenoids, classified in castes depending on their strength.

Ash Ramy is one of the few human survivors, member of the Revolutional Organization; after killing a high-ranking Selenoid, he escapes with the help of Lemiu Winslet, one of the lower ranking Selenoids, who joins his fight against the new Goddess.

References

External links
 Official web page on Tokyopop's web site
 Mania review

2000 manga
Kodansha manga
Seinen manga
Science fiction anime and manga
Tokyopop titles